Castelrosso may refer to:
 the Italian name for the Greek island and municipality of Kastellorizo;
 Castelrosso, a hamlet of Chivasso, Italy;
 Castelrosso cheese, an Italian cheese.